Liveris Andritsos (born December 31, 1959, in Athens, Greece) is a retired Greek professional basketball player and coach. At a height of 2.02 m (6'7 ") tall, he could play at both the small forward and power forward positions.

Professional career
Andritsos started his career with Esperos Kallitheas. In 1982, he moved to Panathinaikos, and with them he won the Greek League championship in 1984, and the Greek Cup title in 1983 and 1986. At the end of his career, Andritsos was the top scorer in Panathinaikos' history, since the A1 Division of the Greek League was formed (since the 1986–87 season), as he had scored 2,088 points. In the current time, he is 8th on the club's career scoring list.

National team career
Andritsos was a member of the senior men's Greek national basketball team. With Greece, he played at the 1981 EuroBasket, the 1983 EuroBasket, and the 1986 FIBA World Championship. He was also a member of the Greek national team that won the gold medal at the 1987 EuroBasket, and the silver medal at the 1989 EuroBasket. He was also a member of the Greek team that finished in 6th place at the 1990 FIBA World Championship. In total, he played in 182 games with the senior Greek national team.

Post-playing career
After his playing career ended, Andritsos worked as a basketball coach and a basketball executive. He worked as the coach of Esperos Kallitheas, and the general manager of Panionios. In 2013, he took the job of general manager of the senior men's Greek national team.

References

External links 
FIBA Profile
FIBA Europe Profile
Hellenic Basketball Federation Profile 

1959 births
Living people
1986 FIBA World Championship players
Greek basketball executives and administrators
Esperos B.C. players
Greek basketball coaches
Greek men's basketball players
1990 FIBA World Championship players
FIBA EuroBasket-winning players
Panathinaikos B.C. players
Power forwards (basketball)
Small forwards
Basketball players from Athens
Mediterranean Games gold medalists for Greece
Mediterranean Games medalists in basketball
Competitors at the 1979 Mediterranean Games